Edward Marlow McIntyre Sr. (November 16, 1931 – August 14, 2004) became the first African American mayor of Augusta, Georgia, in 1981. He had previously served as a county commissioner for Richmond County since 1970, as the first black candidate to win the office. He is notable for a U.S. federal conviction for extortion in 1984. He later received a pardon and mounted three unsuccessful campaigns for the mayoralty, in 1990, 1998 and 2002.

A graduate of Morehouse College, McIntyre worked for the Pilgrim Health Life Insurance Company before entering politics.

See also

List of mayors of Augusta, Georgia

References

External links
 Ed McIntyre funeral program, African American Funeral Programs from the East Central Georgia Regional Library, Digital Library of Georgia

1940 births
2004 deaths
County commissioners in Georgia (U.S. state)
Morehouse College alumni
Mayors of Augusta, Georgia
African-American mayors in Georgia (U.S. state)
Recipients of American presidential pardons
20th-century American politicians
20th-century African-American politicians
21st-century African-American people